The 1914–15 Football League season, the last to be played before the league was abandoned because of the First World War, was Birmingham Football Club's 23rd in the Football League and their 15th in the Second Division. They finished in sixth position in the 20-team division. They also took part in the 1914–15 FA Cup, entering at the first round proper and losing to Oldham Athletic in the third round (last 16).

Twenty-three players made at least one appearance in nationally organised first-team competition, and there were thirteen different goalscorers. Goalkeeper Willie Robb and forward Richard Gibson were ever-present over the 43-match season; full-back Frank Womack and half-back Percy Barton each missed only one game. Andy Smith was leading scorer with 24 goals, of which 21 came in the league.

Football League Second Division

League table (part)

FA Cup

 * Crystal Palace forfeited home advantage for the replay.

Appearances and goals

See also
Birmingham City F.C. seasons

References
General
 Matthews, Tony (1995). Birmingham City: A Complete Record. Breedon Books (Derby). .
 Matthews, Tony (2010). Birmingham City: The Complete Record. DB Publishing (Derby). .
 Source for match dates and results: "Birmingham City 1914–1915: Results". Statto Organisation. Retrieved 19 May 2012.
 Source for lineups, appearances, goalscorers and attendances: Matthews (2010), Complete Record, pp. 274–75. Note that attendance figures are estimated.
 Source for kit: "Birmingham City". Historical Football Kits. Retrieved 22 May 2018.

Specific

Birmingham City F.C. seasons
Birmingham